De Niro is an Italian surname. People with the surname include:

 Drena De Niro (born 1967), American actress and film producer
 Grace Hightower De Niro (born 1955), American philanthropist, socialite, actress, and singer
 Raphael De Niro, New York City real estate broker 
 Robert De Niro (born 1943), American actor, director and producer
 Robert De Niro Sr. (1922–1993), American abstract expressionist painter
 Virginia De Niro alias Virginia Admiral (1915–2000), American painter and poet

Italian-language surnames